"Sweet Dreams of Yesterday" is a single by Canadian country music artist Hank Smith. The song debuted at number 49 on the RPM Country Tracks chart on October 3, 1970. It peaked at number 1 on December 26, 1970.

Chart performance

References

1970 singles
Hank Smith (singer) songs
Quality Records singles
Songs written by Dick Damron